This is an incomplete list of Statutory Instruments made in the United Kingdom in the year 2015.

SI 2015/962: Energy Efficiency (Private Rented Property) (England and Wales) Regulations 2015, known also as the MEES Regulations ("minimum energy efficiency standard") 
SI 2015/1583: Health and Safety at Work etc. Act 1974 (General Duties of Self-Employed Persons) (Prescribed Undertakings) Regulations 2015 
SI 2015/1833: Modern Slavery Act 2015 (Transparency in Supply Chains) Regulations 2015

References

Law of the United Kingdom
2015 in British law
2015 in British politics
Lists of Statutory Instruments of the United Kingdom